WODS (1300 kHz) is a commercial AM broadcasting radio station licensed to West Hazleton, Pennsylvania.  It is owned by Audacy, Inc. and airs a talk radio format.  WODS has a power of 5,000 watts daytime with a directional antenna signal pattern focused towards the north, then switches to a power of 500 Watts at night with another directional signal pattern focused towards the northeast. WODS is considered a Class B station according to the Federal Communications Commission.

WODS is one of four simulcast radio stations in Northeastern Pennsylvania that call themselves WILK Newsradio, along with 103.1 WILK-FM in Avoca, 980 WILK in Wilkes-Barre and 910 WAAF in Scranton.  Studios and offices are on Route 315 in Pittston.  

"WILK Newsradio" has a weekday schedule with mostly local hosts, except for the early afternoon when the station carries Rush Limbaugh.  At night, the stations air nationally syndicated shows including Dave Ramsey, Coast to Coast AM with George Noory and America in The Morning.  Weekends feature shows on money, health, technology and science.  Weekend syndicated hosts include Kim Komando, Clark Howard, Dr. Michio Kaku and "Somewhere in Time with Art Bell."  Some hours on weekends are paid brokered programming.  Most hours begin with world and national news from ABC News Radio.

The stations also carries play-by-play sports including Penn State Nittany Lions football and basketball, as well as Wilkes-Barre/Scranton Penguins minor league hockey.

History

Prior use of 1300 kHz in Hazleton

The first station at 1300 kHz in the Hazleton area operated from October 26, 1961, to January 14, 1965, as WTHT, which became WHZN in 1964. Broadcasting from studios and a transmitter southeast of Hazleton, the station experienced a turbulent final year which included a license renewal designated for hearing, financial problems, and a union strike which prompted the station to go off air for good. An attempt to reactivate the frequency in the late 1960s and early 1970s failed due to its specification of West Hazleton as the city of license despite not covering it completely.

Current license
The current station on 1300 kHz signed on in 1982 with the call sign WWKC, branded as "KC Country", with a country music format. At the time, it only broadcast with 500 watts of power and was a daytimer station, required to sign-off at sunset each day. It was only the second AM station to serve the Hazleton area. The country music format did not do very well in the market, so in 1983, the station changed to an adult standards format with the addition of some local news and talk.  It switched call signs to WXPX, increasing its daytime power to its present 5,000 watts. The WXPX call sign lasted until 1996, when the station was sold and the format and call signs were changed to WILP. 

Another ownership and format change happened in 2001 when the station changed call signs to WOGY. The station was sold to its present owners, Entercom Communications, and joined the WILK News Radio network. 

The station's call signs were changed to WKZN in 2005, and to WODS in 2020.  The WODS call letters were transferred from 103.3 FM in Boston, which had held the call sign since 1987.  When Entercom changed that station's call letters to WBGB, it "parked" the WODS call letters on this station, so they couldn't be used by a rival Boston station.

References

External links

ODS (AM)
Radio stations established in 1982
Audacy, Inc. radio stations
1982 establishments in Pennsylvania
News and talk radio stations in the United States